Aili is a Finnish, Sami and Estonian female given name, with the pronunciation [aɪliː]. It is the Finnish variation of the name Helga, via the Sami Áile, deriving ultimately from heilagr, meaning "holy", or "blessed".  Ailikki is a diminutive.

Aili has also been used as an anglicised spelling of Eilidh, in this case with the pronunciation [eɪli]. Eilidh is a diminutive for Eilionoir, the Scottish version of Eleanor. The meaning of Eleanor is disputed, but the theory most supported by evidence is that it is derived from the Old Germanic name Adenorde, via the Provençal Alienor.

Aili can also be considered a diminutive for various names, such as Aileen.

Some notable bearers of the name Aili:
 Aili Alliksoo (born 1959), Estonian sprinter and hurdler
 Aili Jõgi (born 1931), Estonian patriot 
 Aili Keskitalo (born 1968), Norwegian-Sami politician, president of the Sami Parliament of Norway
 Aili Siiskonen (1907–1983), Finnish journalist, civil servant and politician
 Aili M. Tripp (born 1958), Finnish-American political scientist
 Aili Vahtrapuu (born 1950), Estonian sculptor
 Aili Vint (born 1941), Estonian artist

References

Estonian feminine given names
Finnish feminine given names